You're Not Alone is a 1978 album by American guitarist and blues musician Roy Buchanan. The album was a commercial failure, and led Buchanan to a break and a pause for reflection.

Track listing
 "The Opening...Miles from Earth" (Jean Roussel) – 2:02
 "Turn to Stone" (Joe Walsh, Terry Trabandt) – 5:49
 "Fly... Night Bird" (Roy Buchanan, Andy Newmark, Jean Roussel, Raymond Silva, Willie Weeks) – 7:47
 "1841 Shuffle" (Roy Buchanan, Andy Newmark, Jean Roussel, Willie Weeks) – 4:18
 "Down by the River" (Neil Young) – 8:42
 "Supernova" (Roy Buchanan) – 3:26
 "You're Not Alone" (Andy Newmark, Jean Roussel, Raymond Silva, Willie Weeks) – 8:01

Personnel
Roy Buchanan - lead guitar
Ray Gomez - acoustic and rhythm guitar
Willie Weeks - bass
Andy Newmark - drums
Jean Roussel - keyboards (not credited)

with:
Gary St. Clair - lead vocals on "Down by the River"
Alfa Anderson, David Lasley, Krystal Davis, Luther Vandross - backing vocals on "Down by the River"

References

1978 albums
Roy Buchanan albums
Atlantic Records albums